The Australian Golf Club is a golf club located in Rosebery, a suburb of Sydney, Australia. Although it survived numerous course location changes, it is arguably the oldest golf club in Australia. To date the course has held 20 Australian Open events and most recently in 2017 the event was won by Australian Cameron Davis. The course has been rated the 9th best in the country.

Course

Early history
The Australian Golf Club was founded in 1882, which makes it the oldest golf club in Australia followed by Royal Melbourne Golf Club (founded 1891). However, The Australian did not have a golf course between the years of 1888 and 1895, which has led to debate as to which golf club is the oldest.

The club's first golf course was situated in Moore Park, a suburb of Sydney, but due to a new road the course had to be abandoned six years later in 1888. In 1895 a second, eleven-hole course was built in Waverley, which was used until 1898, when the club's lease expired. The course then moved to Botany, Sydney. It was this course that hosted the 1901 Australian Amateur Championship, and the first Australian Open in 1904.

Present day course
The present day location of the course was inspected in 1903, while a year later plans were put forward for the new course by Carnegie Clark, Jock Hutchison and Gilbert Martin. In 1926 Alister MacKenzie, designer of courses such as Royal Melbourne Golf Club and Augusta National Golf Club, was asked to update holes on the course. Due to the popularity of the course, members approved a new layout in 1949 which supplied the club with two starting holes. In 1967 the proposal of a new road threatened the land on which the course was laid out on. As a result, a redesign by Sloane Morpeth was needed, which was completed in 1973. Between 1977 and 1980 Jack Nicklaus made significant alterations to the course, which included adding length and water hazards, which transformed the course into what it is today.

Present works are under way to improve the course, including the re-routing of a number of holes. The changes will create a more contemporary feel. The club has again commissioned Jack Nicklaus to design the changes, and the course is set to re-open in autumn of 2013.

Course scorecard

Source

Tournaments
The Australian Golf Club has held 20 Australian Opens, with the most recent being from the 23–26 November 2017, which was won by Cameron Davis with a score of 11 under par. The various winners of Australian Opens at The Australian are as follows:

The Australian has also hosted 13 Australian Amateur Championships – the first in 1901, and the most recent in 2015.

References

External links
Official website
The Australian Golf Club Profile, Golf Australia

1882 establishments in Australia
Sports clubs established in 1882
Sports venues completed in 1882
Golf clubs and courses in New South Wales
Sporting clubs in Sydney
Sports venues in Sydney
Golf clubs and courses designed by Jack Nicklaus